Leslie Ash (born 19 February 1960) is an English actress. 

She is best known for her roles in C.A.T.S. Eyes (1985–1987), the BBC sitcom Men Behaving Badly (1992–1997), ITV drama Where the Heart Is (2000–2003), and BBC medical drama Holby City (2009–2010).  Her book  My Life Behaving Badly: The Autobiography was published in 2007.

Early career
Ash was born in Henley-on-Thames, Oxfordshire, and first appeared on British television in 1964 at the age of four asking "Mummy, why are your hands so soft?" in an advertisement for the washing-up product Fairy Liquid. She was educated at the independent Italia Conti Academy stage school, and then started a career as a fashion model appearing on the cover of a number of teenager magazines, including Pink, and Jackie, for which she was photographed by David Bailey.

Having appeared with her sister Debbie in the 1978 British slapstick comedy Rosie Dixon – Night Nurse; her first major film role was playing the romantic lead in Quadrophenia in 1979. In 1980, Ash appeared in the Iron Maiden music video, "Women in Uniform" and one of the two Dire Straits music videos of Tunnel of Love. In 1982 she played the role of a fast food chef in the fifth series of Shelley entitled "When the Chip hits the Fan", and appeared opposite Joan Collins in the film Nutcracker. In 1983, she had the starring role in The Balance of Nature, a film about a Cockney girl from a tower block with aspirations to win the Miss United Kingdom competition. The same year, she played Julie Morgan, alias Juletta Shane, in Curse of the Pink Panther, and also appeared opposite Nicky Henson as Nancy in the ITV situation comedy The Happy Apple playing a secretary whose opinions successfully reflected public opinion. She then played a regular role in crime series C.A.T.S. Eyes. From 1983 until 1987, she was a co-presenter on the Channel 4 music programme The Tube alongside Jools Holland and Paula Yates. In 1984 she appeared opposite Roger Daltrey and former Quadrophenia co-star Toyah Willcox in the thriller Murder: Ultimate Grounds for Divorce, and played Carol Landau in the 1985 comedy film Shadey, directed by Philip Saville.

In 1987, Ash appeared in the first episode of the third series of the ITV comedy series Home to Roost, entitled Human Interest, where Ash played the role of the flamboyant cleaner, Susie Perkins.

Ash's best known role was playing Neil Morrissey's romantic interest Deborah (Debs) in the situation comedy Men Behaving Badly. She continued in the role for six series. She subsequently acted in BBC police drama Merseybeat and the ITV drama Where the Heart Is.

In 1996, during her time on Men Behaving Badly, Leslie released a single "Tell Him" with co-star Caroline Quentin, under the name of "Quentin & Ash". It reached number 25 in the UK singles chart.

Later work
Ash appeared in BBC Radio 4's comic radio series, Vent (2007), alongside Neil Pearson, Fiona Allen and Josie Lawrence.

In May 2008, Ash worked with Transparent Television to make a documentary about the unregulated cosmetic beauty industry whilst exploring her own experiences. The programme, Leslie Ash: Face to Face was broadcast on ITV on 23 September 2008.

In 2009, Ash appeared on daytime TV panel programme Loose Women to discuss her new role in Holby City and her previous health problems. Leslie reappeared on Loose Women on 17 February 2012 where she discussed her on stage tour of All the Single Ladies.

In 2014, Leslie was a contestant on the BBC programme, Celebrity Masterchef. In 2020, she appeared opposite many of her Quadrophenia co-stars in the unofficial semi-sequel To Be Someone. In 2021, it was announced that she would be reprising her role as Vanessa Lytton in an episode of Holby Citys sister series Casualty. In the same year, she also appeared in an episode of the BBC soap opera Doctors as Mary McRae.

Personal life
Ash is married to former footballer Lee Chapman, and they have two sons. Her sister is former 'Hot Gossip' dancer Debbie Ash. They appeared together as sisters in Rosie Dixon – Night Nurse.

Health
Ash contracted toxoplasmosis two months into her pregnancy while in France, where it is more common than in the United Kingdom. She told the BBC that she wished to raise awareness of the issue in Britain.

Ash was hospitalised at the Chelsea and Westminster Hospital in April 2004 after suffering two cracked ribs. She was discharged after a few days, but was readmitted after losing all feeling in her legs. In June 2004 while she was still in hospital, it was announced that a Staphylococcus aureus infection might have rendered her permanently unable to walk. 

In January 2007 Ash confirmed she was suing the hospital. Papers lodged at the High Court asserted that Ash would never return to active TV roles. The hospital admitted breach of duty over part of her treatment but denied responsibility for the extent of her injuries and in January 2008 paid out a record £5m compensation in an out-of-court settlement. Steve Walker, chief executive of the NHS Litigation Authority, said the payout set a new record for compensation following a hospital-acquired infection. The previous highest amount was £500,000. The payment was justified by the NHS compensation body as being "because of the amount Leslie was earning at the time she fell ill and takes into account how much she might have earned in the future".

Lip implants
In her thirties, Ash had a collagen injection to 'plump up' her lips. When she was forty she decided to repeat the procedure with the same plastic surgeon, the mother of a Venezuelan friend. In the second procedure, liquid silicone was injected resulting in extreme swelling of her lips, a condition dubbed as "trout pout" in the press. Subsequent medical analysis showed that the silicone had set and the condition is permanent. During this time Ash starred in a series of advertisements for the DIY chain Homebase (again, with Neil Morrissey) and starred in Merseybeat, which evoked further ridicule from the media about her appearance.

Ash has since spoken out about the press ridicule she received as a result of her botched implants, commenting: "If I'd lost a leg in a car crash, people wouldn't have felt able to take the mickey out of me so mercilessly ... People don't laugh at Heather Mills because she lost a leg."

News of the World legal action

Ash and Chapman sued the News of the World for breach of privacy over suspicions that their voicemails, and those of their two sons, were illegally accessed by private investigator Glenn Mulcaire. They wrote to the police over their suspicions, and the police informed them that there were four pieces of paper referring to Ash in Mulcaire's notebooks, and five items relating to Chapman. There were further items relating to their children.

In August 2011, Ash and Chapman settled a claim against the paper and Mulcaire for an undisclosed sum and received an apology. They planned to take action against other newspapers.

References

External links

 IMDb profile 

1960 births 
Living people
Actresses from Oxfordshire
Alumni of the Italia Conti Academy of Theatre Arts
English film actresses
English television actresses
People from Henley-on-Thames